Unamerican or Un-American may refer to:

Designation used by the House Un-American Activities Committee
UnAmerican (band), English rock band based out of London
The Un-Americans, heel professional wrestling stable from 2002 to 2003
"Unamerican", a 2018 song by Dead Sara from Temporary Things Taking Up Space 
Turned A, a logical symbol for 'un-American'

See also
Anti-Americanism